Suryoyo language may refer to:

Turoyo language, a Central Neo-Aramaic language spoken by Assyrians in southern Turkey and northern Syria
Mlahsô language, an extinct or dormant Central Neo-Aramaic language traditionally spoken in eastern Turkey 
Syriac language, an Eastern Aramaic language, literary language of various Christian communities

See also
Suryoyo or Assyrian people, an ethnic group indigenous to Assyria, a region in the Middle East
Assyrian (disambiguation)
Syriac (disambiguation)